The asphalt miniature owl (Asphaltoglaux cecileae) is an extinct species of true owl which existed in what is now California, U.S.A. during the Late Pleistocene epoch. The species is known from the La Brea Tar Pits. Its osteology suggests a close relation to the owls of the genus Aegolius.

See also
Glaucidium kurochkini, a very similar species also known from the La Brea Tar Pits
Oraristrix, another, much larger owl from the La Brea Tar Pits

References

Pleistocene birds of North America
Strigidae
Birds described in 2012
Late Quaternary prehistoric birds